Dobrynskoye is a rural locality (a selo) in Bogolyubovskoye Rural Settlement, Suzdalsky District, Vladimir Oblast, Russia. The population was 752 as of 2010. There are 11 streets.

Geography 
Dobrynskoye is located on the Nerl River, 40 km southeast of Suzdal (the district's administrative centre) by road. Sokol is the nearest rural locality.

References 

Rural localities in Suzdalsky District
Vladimirsky Uyezd